Simon Christopher Jones (born 16 May 1945) is an English footballer, who played as a goalkeeper in the Football League for Rochdale and Chester.

References

1945 births
Living people
Chester City F.C. players
Footballers from Lincolnshire
Rochdale A.F.C. players
Association football goalkeepers
English Football League players
Stalybridge Celtic F.C. players
Gainsborough Trinity F.C. players
English footballers
People from West Lindsey District